Bator is a surname. Notable people with the surname include:

Joanna Bator (born 1968), Polish novelist, journalist and academic
Marc Bator (born 1972), German television moderator
Paul M. Bator (1929–1989), American law professor and Deputy Solicitor General of the United States
Francis M. Bator (1925–2018) Hungarian-American economist and educator. 
Stiv Bators (1949–1990), born Steven John Bator, American punk rock vocalist and guitarist
Szidor Bátor (1860–1929), Hungarian composer

See also
Bator, Gujrat, Pakistani village
Baghatur